Henry Boyd Hucles Jr. (November 11, 1897 – September 11, 1979) was an American football, basketball, and baseball coach and college athletics administrator. He served as the head football coach at Virginia Union University from 1919 to 1920 and again from 1926 to 1942 and at Prairie View A&M University from 1923 to 1925. Hucles was also the athletic director at Virginia Union from 1926 to 1950. His son, Henry B. Hucles III, became a suffragan bishop in the Episcopal Diocese of Long Island.

He was inducted into the Virginia Sports Hall of Fame in 1997.

Early life and education
Hucles was born in Petersburg, Virginia on November 11, 1897. In 1917, he studied at Wayland Academy in Washington D.C. before attending studying physics at Virginia Union University from 1919 to 1920. While at Virginia Union he founded the Zeta chapter of Omega Psi Phi and earned All-American honors as a quarterback for the Virginia Union Panthers. As a senior, he was player-coach for the team. He graduated with a BSc from Springfield College in 1933. He was instrumental in the establishment of the Richmond Coliseum.

Coaching career
Hucles became the first Virginia Union University student athlete to then become a coach at the school, serving as the player football coach from 1919 to 1920 and then as the head football coach from 1926 to 1942 as well as athletic director and a professor of health and physical education. From 1938 to 1943, he also served as Virginia Union's basketball coach, leading the team to a Central Intercollegiate Athletic Association (CIAA) title in the 1938–39 season. From 1942 to 1943, future Baseball Hall of Famer Larry Doby, played on the Virginia Union basketball team under Hucles.

In 1921, he spent a year coaching at Shaw University.

Hucles was the first head football coach at Prairie View A&M University in Prairie View, Texas and he held that position for two seasons, from 1924 until 1925. His career coaching record at Prairie View was 11–4–1.

Death
Hucles died in Brooklyn, New York in 1979.

Head coaching record

College

See also
 List of college football head coaches with non-consecutive tenure

References

1897 births
1979 deaths
American football halfbacks
American football quarterbacks
Player-coaches
NYU Violets football players
Prairie View A&M Panthers baseball coaches
Prairie View A&M Panthers football coaches
Shaw Bears football coaches
Virginia Union Panthers athletic directors
Virginia Union Panthers baseball coaches
Virginia Union Panthers football coaches
Virginia Union Panthers football players
Virginia Union Panthers men's basketball coaches
Springfield College (Massachusetts) alumni
Sportspeople from Petersburg, Virginia
Coaches of American football from Virginia
Players of American football from Virginia
Baseball coaches from Virginia
Basketball coaches from Virginia
African-American coaches of American football
African-American players of American football
African-American baseball coaches
African-American basketball coaches
African-American college athletic directors in the United States
20th-century African-American sportspeople